Robert Edwin "Rob" Plumb (born  August 29, 1957) is a Canadian former professional ice hockey player who played fourteen games in the National Hockey League with the Detroit Red Wings during the 1977–78 and 1978–79 seasons. The rest of his career, which lasted from 1977 to 1988, was mainly spent in the National League B, the second-highest league in Switzerland. Robert is the brother of Ron Plumb.

Career statistics

Regular season and playoffs

External links
 

1957 births
Living people
Adirondack Red Wings players
Canadian ice hockey centres
Detroit Red Wings draft picks
Detroit Red Wings players
EHC Uzwil players
Ice hockey people from Ontario
Kansas City Red Wings players
Kingston Canadians players
Sportspeople from Kingston, Ontario
ZSC Lions players
Canadian expatriate ice hockey players in Switzerland
Canadian expatriate ice hockey players in the United States